Results of the Quarterfinals of the Eurocup Basketball 2009–10 basketball tournament.

The quarterfinals were two-legged ties determined on aggregate score. The first leg of the Bilbao–Nymburk tie was held on March 23, with the first leg of all other ties held on March 24. The return leg of all ties were played on March 31. The group winner in each tie, listed as "Team #1", hosted the second leg.

All times given below for the first leg are in Central European Time, and for the second leg in Central European Summer Time.

Quarterfinal 1 

 Game 1

 Game 2

Quarterfinal 2 

 Game 1

 Game 2

Quarterfinal 3 

 Game 1

 Game 2

Quarterfinal 4 

 Game 1

 Game 2

External links
Results

2009–10 Eurocup Basketball